KJDX (93.3 FM, "JDX") is a radio station broadcasting a country music format.  Licensed to the city of Susanville, Lassen County, Northeastern California. It serves portions of the northern Sierra Nevada region.

It first began broadcasting in 1983 under the call sign KNXN.  The station is currently owned by Sierra Broadcasting.

History
The station was first assigned the call sign "KNXN" on May 23, 1983 on 102.1 FM. On May 27, 1988, the calls sign was changed to "KQNC". On February 20, 1997, the call sign was changed to KHJQ with a Hot AC format as "Q92". In 2003, the station moved to 92.3 FM.

In the summer of 2008, the station was moved to the recently vacated 93.3 FM frequency. On November 11, 2008, Sierra Broadcasting swapped call signs and formats between KJDX, which had vacated the 93.3 FM frequency in Susanville for the same frequency in Pollock Pines, California (in suburban Sacramento), and KHJQ.

This move brought KJDX back to the 93.3 FM frequency in Susanville.  The newly moved KHJQ became KHLX, and is operated in Sacramento by Clear Channel.

External links
 

JDX
Lassen County, California